Albemarle High School may refer to one of the following schools:

Albemarle High School (North Carolina)
Albemarle High School (Virginia)